Get Low Records is a hip hop record label founded by Memphis Bleek in 1998.

History

Beginnings
Under the guidance of Jay-Z, Memphis Bleek founded his label, Get Low Records, in 1998. The label's first release was Memphis Bleek's gold debut, The Coming of Age. This gained the label some notoriety. During the year 2000, the label began their long-running feud with Nas. The following year, Get Low released Bleek's second album The Understanding, another gold release. After the release of this album, the feud with Nas became public and distributing label, Roc-A-Fella Records quickly came to their defense setting up the epic Jay-Z vs. Nas feud. In the time between Memphis Bleek's second and third albums, he signed former Junior M.A.F.I.A. member, Lil' Cease to the label. He would also sign Geda K. In 2003, the label began feuding with west coast rapper The Game over the similar titling of his label at the time Get Low Recordz, they would trade disses from 2003 until 2007. This all led up to Bleek's third album M.A.D.E. The label would sign Livin Proof, and Gbaby and Latif in 2004. In 2005, the label released Memphis Bleek's fourth album 534. R&B singer Coya was signed that year as well. They also made peace with Nas around this time. Sniper and Phyro Son were signed to the label the following year. The label is currently preparing for the release of albums by Coya, Memphis Bleek, and Lil Cease. In the spring of 2014, Bleek announced that he would no longer use the 'Get Low' name and would re-vamp the company under a new name he chose called "Roc Solid". The new name being an ode to his tenure with Roc-A-Fella Records; the company released two mixtapes from Bleek called "The Movement" & "The Movement 2"

Artists
 Memphis Bleek (CEO)
 Livin' Proof
 Latif
 Geda K
 H. Money Bags
 Calico
 Lil' Cease

Discography
 Coming of Age (Memphis Bleek album) by Memphis Bleek
 Released: August 28, 1999
 Promotional label: Get Low/Roc-A-Fella
 Distributing label: Def Jam Recordings
 Singles:"Memphis Bleek Is," "My Hood to Your Hood," "What You Think of That?"
 The Understanding by Memphis Bleek
 Released: December 5, 2000
 Promotional label: Get Low/Roc-A-Fella
 Distributing label: Def Jam Recordings
 Singles: "Do My," "Is That Your Chick"
 M.A.D.E. by Memphis Bleek
 Released: December 16, 2003
 Promotional label: Get Low/Roc-A-Fella
 Distributing label: Def Jam Recordings
 Singles: "Round Here," "Need Me In Your Life"
 534 by Memphis Bleek
 Released: May 17, 2005
 Promotional label: Get Low/Roc-A-Fella
 Distributing label: Def Jam Recordings
 Singles: "Like That"

References

Record labels established in 1998
American record labels